The Wilhelm von Humboldt Memorial to the left of the Humboldt University main building on Unter den Linden avenue in Berlin's Mitte district commemorates the Prussian polymath and education reformer Wilhelm von Humboldt (1767–1835). Created in 1882 by Paul Otto in neo-baroque style, the marble statue is a masterpiece of the Berlin school of sculpture.

Gallery

References

Further reading

External links 
 
 Wilhelm von Humboldt Memorial – Berlin Monument Authority (in German)

Humboldt University of Berlin
Statues in Berlin
Outdoor sculptures in Berlin
Sculptures of men in Germany
Statues in Germany
Monuments and memorials in Berlin